Szczepan Viktor Witkowski (20 December 1898 – 29 May 1937) was a Polish soldier and skier.

Witkowski was born in Lwów, Kingdom of Galicia and Lodomeria (today Lviv, Ukraine). He was a member of the national Olympic military patrol team in 1924 which was one of two withdrawing to bad weather conditions. He also competed in the men's 50 kilometre event at the 1924 Winter Olympics.

He died in Stryi, Poland (since 1939 Ukraine).

References

1898 births
1937 deaths
Polish military patrol (sport) runners
Military patrol competitors at the 1924 Winter Olympics
Olympic biathletes of Poland
Sportspeople from Lviv
People from the Kingdom of Galicia and Lodomeria
Polish male cross-country skiers
Olympic cross-country skiers of Poland
Cross-country skiers at the 1924 Winter Olympics